Crow's Nest is a village in Cornwall, England.

A Site of Special Scientific Interest, also named Crow's Nest, is located 200m north of the village. It is noted for its geological interest, as well as various species of moss, specifically for being one of only two sites in the world where Cornish path moss (Ditrichum cornubicum) grows, a distinction it shares with the Phoenix United Mine, also located in Cornwall. The SSSI also forms part of Phoenix United Mine and Crow's Nest Special Area of Conservation.

References

Villages in Cornwall
Bodmin Moor
Sites of Special Scientific Interest in Cornwall
Sites of Special Scientific Interest notified in 1999
Special Areas of Conservation in Cornwall